Delphos is a city in Ottawa County, Kansas, United States.  As of the 2020 census, the population of the city was 302.  The community was named after Delphos, Ohio.

History
Delphos was founded in 1867 by Levi and Dan Yockey.  The two brothers moved to the area from Delphos, Ohio and named the new community for their hometown.  Many settlers came to the area looking for a fresh start after the Civil War.

Geography
Delphos is located at  (39.274770, -97.766377).

The city is located on the Solomon River and is five miles west of U.S. Route 81.

Demographics

Delphos is part of the Salina Micropolitan Statistical Area.

2010 census
As of the census of 2010, there were 359 people, 161 households, and 104 families residing in the city. The racial makeup of the city was 96.4% White, 0.8% African American, 0.3% Native American, 0.8% from other races, and 1.7% from two or more races. Hispanic or Latino of any race were 2.2% of the population.

There were 161 households, of which 22.4% had children under the age of 18 living with them, 55.9% were married couples living together, 6.8% had a female householder with no husband present, 1.9% had a male householder with no wife present, and 35.4% were non-families. 32.3% of all households were made up of individuals, and 14.3% had someone living alone who was 65 years of age or older. The average household size was 2.23 and the average family size was 2.72.

The median age in the city was 48.7 years. 21.2% of residents were under the age of 18; 6.6% were between the ages of 18 and 24; 19% were from 25 to 44; 27.5% were from 45 to 64; and 25.6% were 65 years of age or older. The gender makeup of the city was 46.8% male and 53.2% female.

2000 census
As of the census of 2000, there were 469 people, 200 households, and 137 families residing in the city. The racial makeup of the city was 98.93% White, 0.21% Native American, and 0.85% from two or more races. Hispanic or Latino of any race were 1.49% of the population.

There were 200 households, out of which 26.0% had children under the age of 18 living with them, 59.0% were married couples living together, 6.0% had a female householder with no husband present, and 31.5% were non-families. 27.0% of all households were made up of individuals, and 16.0% had someone living alone who was 65 years of age or older. The average household size was 2.35 and the average family size was 2.85.

In the city, the population was spread out, with 23.2% under the age of 18, 7.9% from 18 to 24, 22.8% from 25 to 44, 23.0% from 45 to 64, and 23.0% who were 65 years of age or older. The median age was 42 years. For every 100 females, there were 99.6 males. For every 100 females age 18 and over, there were 92.5 males.

The median income for a household in the city was $31,563, and the median income for a family was $39,038. Males had a median income of $27,292 versus $18,438 for females. The per capita income for the city was $14,801. About 8.8% of families and 9.6% of the population were below the poverty line, including 6.7% of those under age 18 and 12.5% of those age 65 or over.

Education
The community is served by North Ottawa County USD 239 public school district.

Delphos schools were closed through school unification. The Delphos High School mascot was Delphos Maroons.

Notable people
 Grace Bedell, credited with influencing Abraham Lincoln to grow his beard.
 Archie McKain, Major League baseball pitcher
 L. E. Katterfield, graduated in Delphos 1898, became noted Socialist and Communist leader.

References

Further reading

External links
 Delphos - Directory of Public Officials
 Delphos city map, KDOT

Cities in Kansas
Cities in Ottawa County, Kansas
Salina, Kansas micropolitan area
Populated places established in 1867
1867 establishments in Kansas